Crotaphatrema tchabalmbaboensis is a species of caecilian in the family Scolecomorphidae, the tropical or African caecilians. It was discovered in 1997 on Mount Tchabal Mbabo in the Adamawa Plateau, western Cameroon, and described as a new species to science in 2000. Three specimens were collected at the type locality, and no individuals have been observed since.

Description
This caecilian, the third species in the genus Crotaphatrema, is differentiated from the others by size, body shape, color pattern, and the lack of grooves on its collars.

The eyes are not visible externally. The dorsum is blue- black and the venter is cream. The border between the dorsal and ventral coloration has a serrated pattern.

Habitat and conservation
It is not known if it can survive in the surrounding heavily grazed pastureland. Mount Tchabal Mbabo has been proposed as a national park, which provide protection for the species' forest habitat.

References

tchabalmbaboensis
Amphibians of Cameroon
Endemic fauna of Cameroon
Amphibians described in 2000
Taxonomy articles created by Polbot